Pygocentrus is a genus of the piranha family Serrasalmidae. All species are native to tropical and subtropical South America. All the species are predatory, scavengers and may form large schools. The famous red-bellied piranha, Pygocentrus nattereri, is one of four species in the genus.

Species
There are currently four recognized species in this genus:

 Pygocentrus cariba (Humboldt, 1821) (black spot piranha) – Orinoco river basin.
 Pygocentrus nattereri Kner, 1858 (red piranha, red-bellied piranha) – Amazon, Paraguay-Paraná-Uruguay, and Essequibo river basins, as well as various river in northeastern Brazil.
 Pygocentrus palometa Valenciennes, 1850 – Orinoco river basin, possibly a nomen dubium.
 Pygocentrus piraya (G. Cuvier, 1819) (San Francisco piranha) – São Francisco River

References

 Fink, W. 1993. Revision of the piranha genus Pygocentrus (Teleostei, Characiformes). Copeia 3:665-687.
 Machado-Allison, A. & W. Fink. 1996. Los peces caribes de Venezuela> diagnosis, claves, aspectos ecológicos y evolutivos. Universidad Central de Venezuela, CDCH, (Colección Monografías)Caracas, 149p. 

Serrasalmidae
Fish of South America
Taxa named by Johannes Peter Müller
Taxa named by Franz Hermann Troschel